David "Dave" Swift (July 27, 1919 – December 31, 2001) was an American screenwriter, animator, director, and producer. He is best known for writing and directing the 1967 film, How to Succeed in Business Without Really Trying. Swift also worked as an animator and filmmaker at The Walt Disney Studios where he adapted the story of Pollyanna for the screen and wrote and directed The Parent Trap (1961).

Life and career
Born in Minneapolis, Swift's father owned a factory that made sausage casings. After the depression, he dropped out of school at the age of 17 and boarded a freight train to California to pursue his goal of working for Walt Disney. After arriving in Los Angeles, Swift worked several odd jobs to earn money including working as an usher at the Warner Bros. theater. In between work, he attended art school and also attended Hollywood High School at night.  He began his career at The Walt Disney Studio as an office boy and rose to be an assistant animator under Ward Kimball in 1938.

After World War II service with the 8th Air Force, Swift became a radio and television writer. He attracted acclaim as the creator of Mister Peepers. Swift rejoined Disney as the writer, director and producer of Pollyanna, followed by The Parent Trap (1961). After making Love Is a Ball, Swift was then contracted to Columbia Pictures for The Interns, Under the Yum Yum Tree and Good Neighbor Sam, the latter two with Jack Lemmon.  He also created the TV shows Grindl, Camp Runamuck, and Arnie. Swift returned to Disney to write Candleshoe in 1977.

During the 1980s, he worked as a writer and director for television. His final project was the screenplay for the 1998 remake of The Parent Trap, starring Lindsay Lohan, Natasha Richardson and Dennis Quaid.

In 1951, Swift married actress Maggie McNamara. They later divorced. He married model Micheline Swift in 1957 to whom he remained married until his death. The couple had two daughters, Michele and Wendon.

Death
On December 31, 2001, Swift died of heart failure at St. John's Health Center in Santa Monica, California at the age of 82.

References

External links
 
 Papers of David Swift at the Special Collections & University Archives at the University of Iowa

1919 births
2001 deaths
20th-century American male actors
American animators
American animated film directors
American animated film producers
American male film actors
Film producers from California
American male television actors
American male screenwriters
American television directors
Television producers from California
Burials at Forest Lawn Memorial Park (Hollywood Hills)
Hollywood High School alumni
Male actors from Minneapolis
United States Army Air Forces personnel of World War II
Writers from Minneapolis
Film directors from Los Angeles
Screenwriters from Minnesota
Screenwriters from California
Film producers from Minnesota
20th-century American male writers
20th-century American screenwriters
Film directors from Minnesota